The 2013 Autopolis GT 300 km was the seventh round of the 2013 Super GT season and the 8th points scoring race for GT300 cars. It took place on October 6, 2013, at Autopolis near Kamitsue, Oita, Japan.

Background
Dome Racing drivers Frédéric Makowiecki and Naoki Yamamoto were tied on 46 points for the championship lead with Impul's João Paulo de Oliveira and Tsugio Matsuda. Following their win in at the 3 Hours of Fuji Team Mugen extended their championship lead in GT300 to 16 points over the Gainer Mercedes-Benz SLS AMG GT3 of Katsuyuki Hiranaka and Björn Wirdheim. With Autopolis being the 2nd last round of the season, instead of having weight ballast equal to twice the number of points scored in the season, teams that competed in all previous 6 races had their weight ballast reduced to the number of points they scored.

After running a 2013-spec Porsche 997 GT3, Team Taisan reverted to running a 2012-spec Porsche for balance of performance reasons. The GTA adjusted the balance of performance for both JAF-GT and FIA GT3 cars. For the JAF-GT cars the air restrictor sizes were reduced in an effort to reduce power, however The Toyota Prius was not given any adjustments. The Nissan GT-R GT3 was given a slight increase in boost pressure.

39 cars were entered for the race, the only change from the previous round was that the Dijon Racing Callaway Corvette Z06.R GT3 did not enter Autopolis.

Report

Practice
The practice session began in wet conditions. The #36 Lexus Team Petronas TOM'S Lexus SC430 was the fastest car in GT500 and the #10 Gainer Mercedes-Benz SLS AMG GT3 was the fastest GT300 car. The session was red flagged 13 minutes in after Naoki Yamamoto spun off-road and crashed. The session resumed 9 minutes later but due to worsening conditions few teams completed laps on the circuit. The session was later red flagged 48 minutes in and not restarted due to poor visibility.

Qualifying
Qualifying was scheduled to be held on October 5, 2013, but due to the heavy rain and fog that cancelled the practice session, qualifying was cancelled and rescheduled to October 6. Instead of the standard 15 and 8 minute knockout sessions for both GT500 and GT300 cars, there would only be a single 25 minute session for both classes.

Race

Results

Qualifying

Race
Race result is as follows.

GT500 Fastest Lap – Kohei Hirate, #38 Lexus Team Zent Cerumo Lexus SC430 – 1:40.434
GT300 Fastest Lap – Tetsuya Yamano, #61 R&D Sport Subaru BRZ – 1:48.799

Point rankings after the event

GT500 Driver Point rankings

GT300 Driver Point rankings

 Note: Only the top five positions are included for both GT500 and GT300 classes.

References

External links
Super GT official website 

Autopolis GT 300km